Yellow Gangs is a 2022 Indian Kannada language crime and Thriller film directed by Ravindra Parameshwarappa.

The film starring Archana Kottige, Dev Devaiah, Bala Rajwadi, Sathya Ummathal, Arunn Jaanu and Sathya B G are in the main roles.

Sugnan is the cinematographer and music is composed by Rohit Sower. The film will be releasing on 11 November 2022. The entire film was shot with a handheld camera.

Cast 
Archana Kottige as Priya
Dev Devaiah as Vikram
Bala Rajwadi as Krishnappa
Sathya Ummathal as Uncle
Arunn Jaanu Ushna
Sathya B G as Tent Naga

Reception 
Yellow Gangs received a mixed response. OTT Play gave it 3.5 out of 5 ratings. Kannada Newspaper Vijaya Karnataka received 3.5 out of 5 ratings for this film.

References

External links 
 

2022 films
Indian crime thriller films
2022 thriller films
2022 crime films
2020s Kannada-language films